Southwest Airlines is a major United States airline.

Other similarly named airlines:
Air Southwest
Air Southwest (Canada)
China Southwest Airlines
Pacific Southwest Airlines
Southwest Airways, U.S. airline later known as Pacific Air Lines
Southwest Air Lines, Japanese airline later known as Japan Transocean Air
South West Aviation (South Sudan)
South West Aviation (United Kingdom), a defunct British airline